Radka Vodičková (born 7 November 1984 in Jablonec nad Nisou), is a Czech professional triathlete, number 1 according to the ETU ranking 2010, and member of the Czech National Team.

Radka Vodičková lives in Jablonec nad Nisou in the North of the Czech Republic and in Hellikon, Switzerland.

Sports career 

In the Czech Republic Radka Vodičková represents the elite club of Brno Ekol Team, where she also studies sports at Masaryk University.
Since 2008 Radka Vodičková, like Daniela Ryf, is a member of the Wildcats Swiss Triathlon Team  and in 2008 she won e.g. the Uster Triathlon and the Züri Triathlon, both part of the Swiss VW Circuit. Vodičková was also the overall winner of the VW Circuit of the year 2008.

In 2008, Vodičková also took also part in the German Bundesliga representing the Krefelder Kanu Klub, for which she won e.g. the silver medal at Schliersee, and in Spain she represented the Catalan club CN Reus Ploms, for which she won e.g. the Duatlón Villa Madrid in 2009.

Radka Vodičková also attends prestigious non ITU events outside Europe, e.g. in December 2009 she won the gold medal at the famous Laguna Phuket Triathlon, and she also placed first at the Powerman Malaysia.

French Club Championship Series 
In 2010, Radka Vodičková again took part in the prestigious French Club Championship Series Lyonnaise des Eaux, representing TRI Olympique Club Cessonais (= TOCC). At the opening triathlon in Dunkirk (23 May 2010), the only triathlon of the French circuit she attended in 2010, Radka Vodičková placed 30th and still proved to be the second best of her French club.
TOCC is one of the D1 clubs which almost entirely relies upon its foreign elite stars. At the Triathlon de Paris it did not even have three  and at only one of the five triathlons of the circuit it had at least one French female triathlete among the three triathlètes classants l'èquipe.

ITU Competitions 
In the eight years from 2003 to 2010, Radka Vodičková took part in 65 ITU competitions and achieved 38 top ten positions, among which 26 gold, silver and bronze medals.

Unless indicated otherwise the following competitions are triathlons (Olympic Distance) and belong to the Elite Category.
The list is based upon the official ITU rankings and the Athlete's Profile Page.

BG = the sponsor British Gas · DNF = did not finish · DNS = did not start

External links 
 Vodickova's ITU Profile Page
 Czech Triathlon Federation in Czech

Notes 

1984 births
Living people
Sportspeople from Jablonec nad Nisou
Czech female triathletes
Olympic triathletes of the Czech Republic
Triathletes at the 2012 Summer Olympics
20th-century Czech women
21st-century Czech women